Janet Lynda Cheek  (née Biggs; born 1948) is a Falkland Islands politician who served as a Member of the Legislative Assembly for the Stanley constituency from 2009 to 2017. Cheek won re-election in 2013 but stepped down from the assembly at the 2017 election. She was previously a Member of the Legislative Council from 1997 to 2005.

Jan Cheek was born in Stanley and spent much of her childhood in South Georgia. For her A-Levels she was awarded a government scholarship to a study at a grammar school in Dorset. Cheek worked as a Secondary School English teacher from 1969 until 1989. She then moved to Fortuna Ltd. where she rose to become co-owner and director until her retirement in 2008.

Cheek married fellow islander John Cheek (1939–1996) in 1968, with whom she had two children, Miranda and Ros. She then became a grandmother to Hamish(2004), Flora(2005) and Tom(2011). Following John's death in 1996, Cheek became a Trustee of the John Cheek Trust.

She was appointed Member of the Order of the British Empire (MBE) in the 2019 Birthday Honours for services to the Falkland Islands.

References

1948 births
Living people
Falkland Islands businesspeople
Falkland Islands Councillors 1997–2001
Falkland Islands Councillors 2001–2005
Falkland Islands MLAs 2009–2013
Falkland Islands MLAs 2013–2017
Falkland Islands schoolteachers
Falkland Islands women in politics
21st-century British women politicians
20th-century British women politicians
People from Stanley, Falkland Islands
Members of the Order of the British Empire